The 1910–11 United States Senate election were held on various dates in various states. As these U.S. Senate elections were prior to the ratification of the Seventeenth Amendment in 1913, senators were primarily chosen by state legislatures. Senators were elected over a wide range of time throughout 1910 and 1911, and a seat may have been filled months late or remained vacant due to legislative deadlock. However, some states had already begun direct elections during this time. Oregon pioneered direct election and experimented with different measures over several years until it succeeded in 1907. Soon after, Nebraska followed suit and laid the foundation for other states to adopt measures reflecting the people's will. By 1912, as many as 29 states elected senators either as nominees of their party's primary or in conjunction with a general election.

In these elections, terms were up for the senators in Class 1. In conjunction with winning control of the House of Representatives for the first time since the 1892 elections, Democrats flipped 9 Senate seats. This was not enough to flip the Senate, but significantly narrowed the margin of Republican control.

In New York and Florida, the legislature failed to elect until after the beginning of the 62nd Congress on March 4. Special elections were held in six states: Alabama, Georgia, Louisiana, Mississippi, North Dakota, and West Virginia.

Result Summary 
Senate party division, 62nd Congress (1911–1913):
 Majority party: Republican (50 seats)
 Minority party: Democratic (40 seats)
 Other parties: 0
 Vacant: 2
 Total seats: 92

Four seats were added in early 1912 for new states: Arizona (which elected 2 Democrats) and New Mexico (which elected 2 Republicans).

Change in composition

Before the elections 
At the beginning of 1910.

Elections results

Beginning of the next Congress

Race summaries

Special elections during the 61st Congress 
In these elections, the winners were seated during 1910 or in 1911 before March 4; ordered by election date.

In this election, the winner were seated in the 63rd Congress, starting March 4, 1913.

Races leading to the 62nd Congress 

In these general elections, the winners were elected for the term beginning March 4, 1911; ordered by state.

All of the elections involved the Class 1 seats.

Elections during the 62nd Congress 
In these elections, the winners were elected in 1911 after March 4; ordered by date.

Alabama 

Democrat John H. Bankhead was re-elected early January 17, 1911 for the 1913 term.

California 

Incumbent Senator Frank P. Flint, who had been elected in 1905, retired. Republican John D. Works received a plurality of votes cast at a Republican state primary.  Republican A. G. Spalding, however, carried a majority of the legislative districts represented by Republicans. In the legislature, Works was elected January 10, 1911 with 92 votes over Spalding's 21 votes, and a scattering of votes for various Democrats.

Connecticut 

Republican incumbent Morgan Bulkeley, who had been elected in 1905, lost renomination in a Republican legislative caucus 113–64 to George P. McLean.

McLean was then elected January 17, 1911, with 177 votes to Democrat Homer Stille Cummings's 110 votes.

Delaware 

First-term Republican Henry A. du Pont was re-elected January 25, 1911. He beat Democrat Willard Saulsbury Jr..

Saulsbury would be elected in 1913 to the other Delaware senate seat.  Du Pont would lose re-election in 1916, the first popular Senate election in Delaware.

Florida 

In June 1910, incumbent Democrat James Taliaferro lost a non-binding primary to former Governor Napoleon B. Broward for the term which started on March 4, 1911.  Broward died in October.  In early February 1911, Nathan P. Bryan won a non-binding primary for the seat, defeating William A. Blount 19,991 to 19,381.  The governor then appointed Bryan to fill the vacancy.

In April 1911, the Florida Legislature unanimously elected Bryan to the remainder of the term.

Georgia (special) 

Three-term Democrat Alexander S. Clay died November 13, 1910 and Democratic former-Governor of Georgia Joseph M. Terrell was appointed November 17, 1910 to continue the term, pending a special election.

Democratic Governor of Georgia M. Hoke Smith won the July 12, 1911 special election to finish the term that would end in 1915.

Smith had just begun his gubernatorial term July 1, 1911 when he was elected to the Senate. Although formally elected and qualified, Smith chose not to take office until November 16, 1911 so he could continue being Governor of Georgia.

Smith would later be re-elected in 1914 and would serve through 1921.

Indiana

Iowa (special)

Louisiana (special)

Maine

Maryland 

Isidor Rayner won election by an unknown margin for the Class 1 seat.

Massachusetts

Michigan

Minnesota

Mississippi

Mississippi (regular) 

Three-term Democrat Hernando Money retired from the class 1 seat. In 1908 the Mississippi legislature had already unanimously elected Democratic congressman John Sharp Williams early for the next term.

Mississippi (special) 

Three-term Democrat Anselm J. McLaurin died December 22, 1909 and Democrat James Gordon was appointed December 27, 1909 to continue the term pending a special election, in which he was not a candidate.  The day after his appointment to the class 2 seat, he was identified as a former fugitive who had been sought as a suspect in the conspiracy to  assassinate President Abraham Lincoln.  Gordon was listed in 1865 by the United States government as a fugitive, and a reward of $10,000 had been offered for his capture, dead or alive. Later that year, he was ruled out of the suspects.  Gordon then admitted that he had met with John Wilkes Booth in Montreal in March 1865, and had discussed plans to kidnap Lincoln, but denied any discussion of murder.

A plurality of legislators backed the white supremacist James K. Vardaman, but the fractured remainder sought to thwart his extreme racial policies.  A majority united behind Percy to block Vardaman, instead electing Democrat LeRoy Percy February 23, 1910 to finish the term that would end in 1913.

Percy would later lose renomination in 1912 to the next term.

Missouri

Montana 

Democrat Henry L. Myers was elected on the 80th joint ballot by the Montana state legislature, winning 53 votes to incumbent Republican Thomas H. Carter's 45. Carter had led on the first ballot with 31 votes to Democrat Thomas J. Walsh's 28.

Nebraska

Nevada

New Jersey

New York 

Republican incumbent Chauncey M. Depew had been re-elected to this seat in 1905, and his term would expire on March 3, 1911.  At the State election in November 1910, John Alden Dix was elected Governor, the first Democrat to hold the position since 1894. Democrats also unexpectedly carried the state legislative elections, and controlled both the Senate and the Assembly.  The 134th New York State Legislature met from January 4 to October 6, 1911, in Albany, New York.  Democratic Ex-Lieutenant Governor William F. Sheehan announced his candidacy on December 30, 1910. Before the State election, when a Democratic victory seemed to be improbable, Sheehan had made an agreement with Tammany Hall leader Charles Francis Murphy that the Tammany men would support Sheehan for the U.S. Senate.  The Democratic caucus met on January 16 and nominated Sheehan over Edward M. Shepard and D. Cady Herrick.  The Republican caucus met on January 16 and re-nominated Chauncey M. Depew unanimously.

From January 17 through March 3, the legislature was deadlocked through 39 ballots, with anti-Tammany Democrats led by newly elected State Senator Franklin Delano Roosevelt refusing to support Sheehan.  On March 3, 1911 Depew's term ended.

The deadlock continued over another 19 ballots despite the vacant seat.  Democrats then held a new caucus and nominated James A. O'Gorman, a justice of the New York Supreme Court.  O'Gorman was elected over Depew on March 31, 1911.

North Dakota

North Dakota (special)

North Dakota (regular)

Ohio

Pennsylvania 

The Pennsylvania election was held January 17, 1911. Incumbent George T. Oliver was re-elected by the Pennsylvania General Assembly.

Rhode Island

Tennessee

Texas

Utah

Vermont

Virginia

Washington

West Virginia

West Virginia (regular)

West Virginia (special)

Wisconsin

Wyoming

See also 
 1910 United States elections
 1910 United States House of Representatives elections
 61st United States Congress
 62nd United States Congress

Notes

References

Sources